Bullein is a surname. Notable people with the surname include:

William Bullein (c.1515–1576), English physician and cleric
William Bullein Johnson (1782–1862), American Baptist minister

In 1939, Electric Engineer and Sewing Machinist were the top reported jobs for men and women in the UK named Bullein. 50% of Bullein men worked as an Electric Engineer and 50% of Bullein women worked as a Sewing Machinist. Some less common occupations for Americans named Bullein were Tailors Viewer and Unpaid Domestic Duties